Jonathan Peters (born January 25, 1969) is an American DJ, remixer and producer. He is known for his remix of Whitney Houston's "My Love Is Your Love". He was the long-time resident DJ of the Manhattan nightclub The Sound Factory.

Discography

Albums

Singles

References

External links

1969 births
Living people
Club DJs
American DJs
DJs from New York City
American electronic musicians
Record producers from New York (state)
Remixers
Place of birth missing (living people)
Electronic dance music DJs